Pentz may refer to:

Pentz, Nova Scotia, a rural community in Nova aScotia, Canada
Pentz (surname), people with the surname

See also
Pentzia, a genus of African plants in the chamomile tribe of the sunflower family